Krausnick may refer to:

Places 
 Krausnick, a village in the Dahme-Spreewald district of Brandenburg, Germany.
 Krausnick hills, a small range of hills near Krausnick.

Surname 
 Helmut Krausnick (1905–1990), German historian and writer.
 Heinrich Wilhelm Krausnick (1797–1882), German lawyer and Lord Mayor of Berlin.